was a Japanese right-wing ultranationalist and a prominent figure in the rise of organized crime in Japan. The most famous kuromaku, or behind-the-scenes power broker, of the 20th century, he was active in Japan's political arena and criminal underworld from the 1930s to the 1970s, and became enormously wealthy through his involvement in smuggling operations.

Early life

Yoshio Kodama was born on February 18, 1911, in Nihonmatsu, Fukushima, Japan to a family formerly of samurai status. Kodama was the fifth son of a bankrupt Nihonmatsu businessman. Due to his family's straitened circumstances, in 1920 Kodama was sent to live with a married older sister in Korea and lived there for three years. He was treated badly, suffered from isolation and had to do child labor in a steel mill.

Early right-wing activism
Returning to Japan as a teenager, Kodama joined a variety of right-wing nationalist groups. At the end of the 1920s he joined the secret society Gen'yōsha. In 1929, he joined Bin Akao's "National Foundation Society" (建国会, Kenkokukai). In 1929, during a parade, he tried to give Emperor Hirohito a self-written appeal for increased patriotism. However, he was intercepted by the security forces and arrested for his role in the "Direct Appeal to the Emperor Incident" (天皇直訴事件, Tennō Jikiso Jiken). He was imprisoned for six months. During this time in prison he wrote his first book, a primer for fanatical Japanese nationalists. After his release from prison, he joined Tatsuo Tsukui's Radical Patriotic Party (急進愛国党, Kyūshin Aikokutō). Tōyama Mitsuru from the Gen'yōsha (Dark Ocean Society), a secret society founded in the late 19th century that first grouped extreme rightists and yakuza together, sent him to Manchuria. There he was involved in the suppression of the anti-Japanese resistance working under the chief of Japanese military intelligence in the region, Colonel Kenji Doihara. A few months later, Kodama returned to Japan. In 1931, Kodama was imprisoned again for his role in the "Diet Pamphlet Distribution Case" (国会ビラ撒き事件, Kokkai Biramaki Jiken). He was released in 1932.

In 1933, Kodama formed his own ultranationalist group called the Independent Youth Society (独立青年社, Dokuritsu Seinensha), which planned to assassinate various Japanese politicians. Its main activity was opium export from Japan to Korea and Manchuria to break the resistance of the local population against the Japanese rule.
His group, in collaboration with the group Tenkōkai (天行会, "Society for Heavenly Action") was responsible for the murder of three Japanese politicians who advocated the peaceful coexistence of Japan, Korea and China. In 1934, Kodama was involved in the planning of an assassination attempt on Prime Minister Saitō Makoto. Kodama's plot was uncovered, the attack was prevented by the Japanese police and Kodama was arrested. He served a prison term of three and half years. He was released from Fuchū prison at the instigation of Doihara, by this time promoted to major general, just prior to the outbreak of the Second Sino-Japanese War in April 1937.

Second Sino-Japanese War and the Pacific War 

In 1937, the Second Sino-Japanese War broke out following a clash between Japanese and Chinese troops in the Marco Polo Bridge Incident, which precipitated a full-scale invasion of China Proper by Japanese forces. After the conquest of Shanghai by Japanese troops, Kodama was summoned there by his old mentor Doihara. Among other things, he served in 1939 as a bodyguard for the Chinese collaborator Wang Jingwei. During his work he met the vice admiral and later founder of the Kamikaze units Takijirō Ōnishi, with whom he built a good friendship.

From 1939 to 1941 he traveled through China as a Japanese spy and built up a network that included various triads collaborating with the Japanese. Like other Japanese secret service agents, he founded his own "Kodama Organization" (Kodama Kikan), which, thanks to his relationship with Admiral Ōnishi, had an exclusive contract as a purchasing agent in China for the aviation forces of the Imperial Japanese Navy.

With these resources, Kodama was able to use what he described as "self-sacrificing youth" to engage in large-scale plunder in Manchuria and China and sell the stolen goods at a high profit in Japan. Kodama publicly regarded this activity as purely idealistic and patriotic. By 1945, Kodama had become one of the richest men in Asia with assets equivalent to $175 million US dollars.

Towards the end of the Pacific War, Kodama was promoted to Rear Admiral in the Imperial Japanese Navy.

Post-War detention in Sugamo Prison 

At the end of World War II, the defeat of Japan initially represented an enormous setback for Kodama. Shortly after the announcement of the unconditional surrender of Japan on August 15, 1945, he witnessed the ritual suicide of Admiral Ōnishi, but was subsequently unable to bring himself to commit seppuku. A little later he acted as an advisor to the Japanese interim government of Prince Naruhiko Higashikuni. Since Kodama feared the confiscation of his property by the US occupation authorities, he gave parts of it to the Yakuza chief Karoku Tsuji. Other possessions were kept on the grounds of the Imperial Palace in Tokyo.

In March 1946, Kodama was arrested by the United States as a suspected Class A war criminal. He was held in Sugamo Prison with Ryoichi Sasakawa, where the two formed a long friendship. Kodama also formed a close relationship with fellow suspected Class-A war criminal (and future prime minister) Nobusuke Kishi. Since he had a lot of time, Kodama was able to keep himself up to date on current events and far-reaching political changes in East Asia in all available daily newspapers. He realized that the new democratic forces in Japan were weak, observing that "in the midst of all this rapid change, there is one thing which is lagging behind. This is parliamentary power." While imprisoned, Kodama wrote Sugamo Diary (a chronicle of his experience in prison) and I Was Defeated (an autobiographical work).

Like many other alleged Japanese war criminals, Kodama was recruited by the US G-2 (Intelligence) under Charles A. Willoughby while in custody. In 1948, the US intelligence community was able to drop all charges against him on the condition that he would support all anti-communist activities of the G-2 CIC division in Asia. On December 24, 1948, he left Sugamo Prison as a free man and was never imprisoned again for the rest of his life. Kodama spent a total of six and a half years of his life in prisons. Kodama, being a right-wing ultranationalist, eagerly fulfilled his end of the bargain, using his fortune and network of contacts to quell labor disputes, root out Communist sympathizers and otherwise fight socialist activities in Japan. In 1949, the CIA paid him to smuggle a shipment of tungsten out of China. The shipment never arrived but Kodama kept his money.

Political fixer

In 1949 Kodama led the Meiraki-gumi gang against labor unions at the Hokutan coal mine. He began to use the fortune he had accumulated in China and subsequently hidden, which supposedly amounted to 70 million yen (not including the platinum and diamonds he spirited away), to covertly influence electoral politics in postwar Japan.

In 1955, Kodama's Sugamo Prison acquaintance Nobusuke Kishi, with the covert backing of the CIA, engineered the formation of the conservative Liberal Democratic Party (LDP) via the merger of the Liberal Party and the Democratic Party. In the 1950s and 1960s, the CIA spent millions to support the LDP, for intelligence gathering and to make Japan a bulwark against communism in Asia. Using his preexisting connections to the CIA, Kodama served as a political fixer (kuromaku) who secretly funneled funds to conservatives.

In his role as fixer, conservative politicians turned to Kodama if they had problems. An example of his role as fixer was the planned state visit by US President Dwight D. Eisenhower in 1960, in connection with the revision of U.S.-Japan Security Treaty (known as Anpo in Japanese), intended to cement the U.S.-Japan alliance. In an effort to prevent the ratification of the treaty and prevent Eisenhower's visit, a coalition of left-leaning opposition groups and civic organizations carried out the massive 1960 Anpo Protests. As the protests dramatically escalated in June 1960, now-Prime Minister Nobusuke Kishi asked his old friend Kodama to organize right-wing thugs and yakuza gangsters as a private police force to secure the streets for Eisenhower's visit. Kodama obliged, using his right-wing connections to prepare a "Welcoming Ike to Japan Mobilization Plan" which he claimed would be able to put nearly 150,000 young rightists on the streets in order to "protect" President Eisenhower from left-wing protesters. Kodama's detailed plan promised to mobilize exactly 146,879 men, whereas Japan's National Police Agency later estimated that he could realistically mobilize at most 120,506. As a result, around 28,000 yakuza from different gangs organized a security service on their own and in cooperation with the police. Right-wing groups also staged counter-protests in favor of the Treaty. However, due to the violent June 15th Incident, in which female university student Michiko Kanba was killed, Kishi was forced to cancel Eisenhower's visit and Kodama's force was not needed.

Zen'ai Kaigi carried out a variety of counter-protest activities in support of the conservative Kishi government, and by the end of the protests had grown to include more than 100 organizations. In this way, the 1960 Anpo protests helped cement the interlocking relationships between right-wing nationalists, yakuza gangsters, and conservative political interests, with Kodama playing a starring role.

In April 1961, Kodama formed his own sub-faction within the Zen'ai Kaigi called Seinen Shiso Kenkyukai (Society for the Study of Youth Ideology), which represented a hard core within the umbrella organization, mainly yakuza. At the end of the 1960s, the Shiso Kenkyukai split from Zen'ai Kaigi . Its members received military training and were used to intimidate unpopular journalists and book authors. One of the victims of this organization was the journalist , whose book entitled Black Money was not published after multiple threats.

In 1963, Kodama attempted to form a coalition of Japan's organized crime groups. However, Kazuo Taoka withdrew the Yamaguchi-gumi early on in talks, leaving Kodama with a Tokyo-centered group that would become known as the Kanto-kai. The organization was formed of seven yakuza groups (including the Sumiyoshi-kai and Matsuba-kai), with the purpose of fostering relations between the groups and promoting rightist goals. With Kodama unable to smooth over its internal conflicts, the Kanto-kai dissolved in January 1965.

Kodama was able to grow his fortune until the mid-1970s. He owned shares in Hisayuki Machii's Ginza nightclub empire, a shipping company, a baseball team, a film studio, and several sports magazines.

Kodama maintained close relations with LDP politicians, such as the yakuza-connected LDP Vice President Ōno Bamboku, and his influence did not suffer until he was identified as the key kuromaku in the Lockheed Corporation bribery scandal. Kodama had been a paid agent of Lockheed since 1958 and received $U.S.7 million for his help in arranging the TriStar aircraft deal.

Lockheed scandal and final years 

In the 1970s, it came to light that Kodama had played a role in the Lockheed L-1011 bribery scandal, which effectively ended his career as a right-wing fixer.

After the Lockheed scandal, disillusioned ultranationalist Roman Porno film actor Mitsuyasu Maeno attempted to assassinate Kodama by flying a Piper PA-28 Cherokee plane kamikaze-style into his mansion in Setagaya Ward's Todoroki. The attempt failed. Maeno hit the second floor of Kodama's mansion and died in the plane crash, but Kodama was unharmed in a different room. He was recovering from a stroke at the time.

In June 1977, charges were brought against Kodama for tax evasion related to the scandal, but the trial was never completed before he died. Kodama died in his sleep of a stroke in Tokyo on January 17, 1984.

Personal life
Kodama was married twice. A brief 1935 marriage ended in divorce. In 1940, Kodama married his second wife, Sayoko, with whom he had two children, a son and a daughter. Sayoko died in a car accident in the spring of 1958.

References

Citations

Works cited

Further reading 

 Richard Deacon: Kempei Tai - A History of the Japanese Secret Service. Beaufort Books New York, ISBN 0-8253-0131-9
 Anja Herold: Die Macht der Yakuza. Geo Epoche Nr. 48, Gruner & Jahr, Hamburg 28. März 2011, S. 142–159; ISBN 978-3-652-00029-1
  (Social Problems Research Group): ; Transcription: "Uyoku jiten: minzoku ha zenbō"; Translation: "Lexicon of the Japanese Right: Complete Overview of the Fraction"; Futabasha, Tōkyō, 1970
 Gabriele Kawamura: Yakuza – Gesellschaftliche Bedingungen organisierter Kriminalität in Japan. Centaurus Verlag, Pfaffenweiler 1994, ISBN 3-89085-898-8
  (Takemori, Hisaakira): ""; Transcription: "Miezaru seifu: Kodama Yoshio to sono kuro no jinmyaku"; Translation: "Government's Transparent Theater: Kodama Yoshio's Excellent Relationship". Shiraishi Shoten, Shōwa 51, Tōkyō [1976]
 S. Noma (Hrsg.): Kodama Yoshio. In: Japan. An Illustrated Encyclopedia. Kodansha, 1993, ISBN 4-06-205938-X. S. 804.
 Hunter, Janet: "Kodama Yoshio." In: Concise Dictionary of Modern Japanese History. Kodansha International. 1984. ISBN 4-7700-1193-8.
 Anonymous author: ; Transcription: "Kuromaku, Kodama Yoshio: Jimintō ni karamaritsuku bukimi na kage / Mainichi Shinbun Seijibu hen"; Translation: Eminence Gray Kodama Yoshio: The Liberal Democratic Party and the two sides of its sinister chief gurus acting out of the shadows / volume of the Mainichi Shinbun series on politics ". Ēru Shuppansha / Yell books, Shōwa 51, Tōkyō [1976]

1911 births
1984 deaths
Japanese fascists
Japanese admirals of World War II
Japanese crime bosses
Japanese drug traffickers
Japanese prisoners and detainees
Neo-fascists
Nationalist terrorism
Yakuza members
People from Fukushima Prefecture
Prisoners and detainees of Japan
Prisoners and detainees of the United States military
Lockheed bribery scandals